Frank the Wabbit is a 1998 Canadian animated short film by Academy Award-winning animator John Weldon. The film centres on a highly intelligent rabbit with a philosophical worldview and a quick wit to survive and prosper even when the farmer's carrots disappeared.

The film had its genesis in a bedtime story that Weldon made up for his young daughter.

The film received a Genie Award nomination for Best Animated Short at the 19th Genie Awards in 1999.

In 1999, it was one of eight National Film Board of Canada projects criticized by Reform Party of Canada MP John Williams as a "waste of taxpayers' money".

References

External links

1998 films
1998 animated films
1990s animated short films
Canadian animated short films
Films directed by John Weldon
Animated films about rabbits and hares
National Film Board of Canada animated short films
1990s Canadian films